ASOT may stand for:
Antistreptolysin O titre
A State of Trance, a radio show hosted by Armin van Buuren
A Sound of Thunder (disambiguation)
"A series of tubes", phrase coined originally as an analogy by then-U.S. Senator Ted Stevens to describe the Internet in the context of opposing network neutrality.